John Irving Taylor (January 14, 1875 – January 26, 1938) was an American baseball executive. He was principal owner of the Boston Red Sox from 1904 until 1911, and remained a part owner until 1914.

Biography
Taylor was the son of Charles H. Taylor, publisher of The Boston Globe; a brother, William O. Taylor, would later succeed their father as publisher. John, William, and a third brother, Charles Jr., all worked for the Globe, although John's tenure was limited to several years after high school.

Taylor purchased the Red Sox from Henry Killilea on April 19, 1904, with his father Charles serving as a minority owner. In September 1911, the Taylors sold half of the stock in the team to Jimmy McAleer and Robert B. McRoy, with McAleer taking over as team president. During this time, the Red Sox won the 1912 World Series. On December 21, 1913, Joseph Lannin, Frank P. Cooper, and John R. Turner purchased McAleer and McRoy's half of the team with Lannin becoming team president. On May 15, 1914, Lannin bought out all of his partners and became sole owner of the Red Sox.

In his later years, Taylor lived in Dedham, Massachusetts, and died in hospital following a brief illness on January 26, 1938, aged 63. He is interred with his wife Daisy in Forest Hills Cemetery in Jamaica Plain, Massachusetts.

A son, John Ingalls Taylor, served as president of the Globe (1963–1975) and a grandson, Benjamin B. Taylor, served as president (1993–1997) and publisher (1997–1999). Taylor was inducted to the Boston Red Sox Hall of Fame in 2012.

Notes

References

Further reading

External links

1938 deaths
1875 births
People from Somerville, Massachusetts
Businesspeople from Dedham, Massachusetts
Boston Red Sox owners
Major League Baseball owners
The Boston Globe people
Taylor family